Matheus Purcelo Blecha de Moraes (born 22 April 2000), known as Matheus Moraes or simply Moraes, is a Brazilian footballer for Maringá. Mainly a forward, he can also play as an attacking midfielder.

Club career
Born in Mogi Mirim, São Paulo, Moraes joined Santos' youth setup in 2011, aged ten. On 31 July 2017, he signed his first professional contract with the club, agreeing to a three-year deal.

Struggling severely with injuries, Moraes could not feature regularly for the youth sides, but still renewed his contract until 2022 on 24 January 2020. On 21 July, he was registered for the year's Campeonato Paulista.

On 5 February 2021, Moraes was loaned to Maringá for the 2021 Campeonato Paranaense. He made his professional debut on 23 March, coming on as a 65th-minute substitute for Vinícius Faria but being subbed off nine minutes later due to an injury in a 0–1 home loss against Coritiba.

Moraes scored his first senior goals on 15 May 2021, netting a brace in a 9–1 away success over Cascavel CR. He returned to Santos after his loan ended, playing for the under-23s, before rejoining Maringá also on loan on 6 January 2022. However, he was unable to play after suffering a fracture on his fibula shortly after.

On 1 July 2022, Moraes left Santos as his contract expired, and joined Londrina on 8 August. On 30 November, after only two unused substitute appearances, he returned to Maringá on a permanent deal.

Career statistics

References

External links

2000 births
Living people
Footballers from São Paulo (state)
Brazilian footballers
Association football midfielders
Association football forwards
Campeonato Paranaense players
Santos FC players
Maringá Futebol Clube players
Londrina Esporte Clube players
People from Mogi Mirim